Allen French (28 November 1870 –6 October 1946) was a historian and children's book author who did major research on the battles of Lexington and Concord, during the American Revolutionary War.  He was a founding member and president of the Thoreau Society.

Biography
Born in Boston, French attended Harvard University for his undergraduate education. Several of his children's books were illustrated by painter Andrew Wyeth.

Works

Fiction
Sir Marrok: A Tale of the Days of King Arthur (1902); New York: Century.
At Plattsburg (1917), Charles Scribner's Sons, New York.
The Story of Rolf and the Viking Bow (1924), Boston: Little, Brown, and Company.
The Red Keep: A story of Burgundy in Year 1165 (19??) [1997], Warsaw, N.D.:Ignatius Press.
The Lost Baron
Heroes of Iceland
The Story of Grettir the Strong
The Colonials
The Barrier
Pelham and His Friend Tim

Non-fiction
The Siege of Boston (1911), New York: The Macmillan Company.
First Year of the American Revolution
General Gage's Informers
Historic Concord and the Lexington Fight
Charles I and the Puritan Upheaval: A Study of the Causes of the Great Migration (1955), Houghton Mifflin.

References

External links

 
 
 
 
 ALLEN FRENCH PAPERS, 1898-1957, Concord Free Public Library, Concord, MA

1870 births
1946 deaths
American children's writers
American military historians
Harvard University alumni